WWKT-FM (99.3 MHz) is a radio station  broadcasting a country music format. Licensed to Kingstree, South Carolina, United States, the station serves the Florence/Sumter/Kingstree area.  The station is currently owned by Community Broadcasters, LLC. The station is commonly known as "99-3, the Cat", and their line-up includes "The Mudflap & Palmer Show" featuring Mudflap & Ed Palmer from 6-10am weekdays, Tony Lynn from 10a-3p, and Dave Anthony from 3p-7p, and 'The Big Time With Whitney Allen" from 7p-midnight .

References

External links

WKT-FM